The House of the Huangcheng Chancellor, also known by its Chinese name, Huangcheng Xiangfu, is a  walled estate on Phoenix Hill (Fenghuangshan) comprising Huangcheng, a village occupying a hollow above the Changhe Valley between Yangcheng and Jincheng in southeastern Shanxi, China. It is composed of numerous siheyuan-style courtyards built into the side of a hill, overlooked by defensive towers and enclosed by high crenellated walls that divide it into two sections. The fortifications were built in the seventeenth and eighteenth centuries, during the late Ming and early Qing dynasties.

It has been called the "greatest cultural residence in North China". China's National Tourism Administration gave it a AAAAA rating in 2011.

History
The Chen family in Shanxi began erecting buildings on Phoenix Hill overlooking the Fanxi River around the 1440s under China's Ming dynasty. The family began as farmers, built a fortune through coal mining, and then began emphasizing the education of their children. During the Ming and Qing dynasties, the family produced 66 mandarins, 33 poets, and 9 first-place winners of Shanxi's provincial examinations.

The property was encastellated for Chen Changyan in 1633. The fortifications served to protect the household and its attendant villagers from unrest during the reign of the Chongzhen Emperor. This "inner city"  Nèichéng) runs along a north–south axis along the side of the hill, facing downhill toward the west.

The compound was expanded in 1703 for Chen Tingjing, tutor to the Kangxi Emperor of the Qing and the chief editor of the Kangxi Dictionary. His "outer city"  Wàichéng) lies on flat ground against the entrance to the upper section of the estate, facing south toward the warehouses and shops lining the Street of Ancient Culture. Supposedly, the grand nature of the finished complex drew charges of disloyalty and imperial pretensions from Chen's political opponents, but he claimed to have established it to please his mother, who wished to see Beijing, but was too frail to complete the journey. In any case, the Kangxi Emperor visited the location twice, praising it and its owner, who never fell from his favor.

The site was damaged during the Cultural Revolution in the 1960s and 1970s. It received a 30mRMB restoration starting in 1998, and the China National Tourism Administration named the House of the Huangcheng Chancellor a AAAAA tourist attraction in 2011. By 2012, it was attracting millions of visitors each year.

Architecture

The walls have nine gates and enclose 19 gardens and 640 rooms. In its present form, almost all of the structures are organized in the siheyuan style, with most buildings opening onto enclosed and interconnected courtyards.

The Shideyuan  Shìdéyuàn; 1505 1521) encloses three lofty rooms on the hilltop, now at the southeast corner of the "inner city". It was the site of Chen Tingjing's birth in 1638. The yard to its rear is flanked to the north by the Zhongyi and to the south by the Yongkun. Both are composed of a three-story main building with two-story wing buildings extending forward at each side.

Rongshan's House  Róngshān Gōngfǔ) was the home of Chen Tianyou (styled "Rongshan"), the first member of the family to pass the imperial examinations and become a mandarin. He began to serve under the Jiajing Emperor, eventually reaching the rank of vice-inspector for Shaanxi.

The Clan Temple   Chénshì Zōngcí; 1521 1567) is the Chen's ancestral shrine, placed on the central axis of the estate, with a worshipping hall in the front and a hall of celebrated ancestors in the back.

The Tower of Rivers and Mountains   Héshānlóu; 1632) was a defensive structure used to protect the family and its attendants during periods of unrest and war. Counting the basement, it has seven stories, totaling tenzhang (about 30m or 100ft). The entrance is located on the second floor and is accessed only by a bridge to another level of the complex. The base is 3zhangs, 4chi wide (kaijian) by 2zhangs, 4chi long (jinshen). Its basement accesses multiple secret tunnels; it also includes a well and room for food stores to wait out longer sieges. It was completed in a span of seven months  and supposedly proved its worth shortly after construction, when locals easily weathered a raid that devastated the neighboring village of Guoyu.

The Villa of the Golden Mean   Zhōngdàozhuāng; 1642) was Chen Tingjing's primary residence.

The House of the Academician   Dàxuéshì Dì) or Chancellor  Xiāngfǔyuàn; 1644–1703) is a complete household with gardens, a hall, a study, bedrooms, and servant quarters. It was visited by the Kangxi Emperor twice, and he wrote a plaque in its honor.

The Studying Rooms   Nánshūyuàn; 1651) are a courtyard and adjacent classrooms used for centuries by tutors to educate the younger members of the family.

The Zhiyuan Garden   Zhǐyuán; 1661) is the biggest garden in the estate, covering .

The Stone Portal  Shípáifāng; 1699) is a paifang that was erected while Chen Tingjing was the imperial Minister of Personnel. It is decorated with panels detailing the accomplishments of the Chens over the preceding five generations. A plaque by the Kangxi Emperor reads "Nine winners of the state examination within one family full of virtues and good deeds, and six academicians throughout three generations bearing the favor and trust of the Emperor".

The Tower of Imperial Handwriting   Yùshūlóu; 1714) was built to store plaques and other written documents given to the family by the Kangxi Emperor.

Other areas of the estate include the Douzhuju Residence  Dòuzhùjū); the Wenchang Tower   Wénchānggé) with its Confucian shrine; the Chunqiu Tower of General Guan   Chūnqiūgé) with its shrine to the war god Guan Yu; the Xishanyuan Courtyard  Xīshānyuàn) with its area for Taoist rituals; the "Cave of Fighters" garrison (Zàngbīngdòng), whose rooms are built into the side of the hill; the Qilin Yard  Qílínyuàn) first built for Chen Tingjing's grandfather Chen Jingji, with its stone decorations of the "Chinese unicorn" or qilin; the Wanghe Pavilion  Wànghétíng) and Yard of Young Ladies  Xiǎojieyuàn) in the women's quarters on the lowest level; the Ziyunqian Graveyard  Zǐyúnqiān) with memorials to Chen Tingjing by his family and the Kangxi Emperor; the southern-style West Garden   Xīhuāyuán), consisting of Clam Pool and surrounding rockeries imitating Shandong's Mount Tai; the Housekeepers' Yard  Guǎnjiāyuàn) with the small, lower-ranking servants' quarters; and a Street of Ancient Culture  Gǔwénhuā Jiē) in the estate's old trading and warehousing area.

Performances
The estate holds a ceremony imitating those held to welcome the Kangxi Emperor.

Museums

The Inspector's House  Yùshǐfǔ) was originally the home of Chen Changyan, an uncle of Chen Tingjing, who served as the imperial inspector for Zhejiang. It is now used as a museum to describe Yangcheng County's history of iron casting.

The complex now also houses the Chinese Dictionary Museum   Zhōnghuá Zìdiǎn Bówùguǎn). The museum, established in May 2016 with a private donation of 4,000 works, now holds more than 15,000 volumes. It describes the history of Chinese encyclopedias and dictionaries, with a special focus on the Kangxi Zidian, compiled under Chen Tingjing. The museum has 128 editions of the dictionary, the earliest copy having been donated by Hua Shaofeng in 2014 and dating to the Kangxi Era. It is so fragile that special tools are used to turn its pages.

In popular culture
Ten movies or television shows have been produced at the mansion since its reopening in 1998, including the 2001 CCTV drama Kangxi Dynasty.

See also
 List of AAAAA-rated tourist attractions in the People's Republic of China
 Shanxi Courtyard Houses

Notes

References

Citations

Bibliography
 . &
 .

External links

 A diagram of the layout of the complex, from Wang's paper, after an original by Yang Jing.
 Drone photos of the inner city

AAAAA-rated tourist attractions
History of Shanxi
Major National Historical and Cultural Sites in Shanxi
Villages in China